Viveka is an Indian lyricist working on Tamil language films. His debut movie was Nee Varuvai Ena. Viveka has worked on over 2000+ songs.

He has got many awards for his songs which have been listened all over the world.

Filmography

As a song lyricist

Television 
 2010 Kodi Mullai

References

Tamil film poets
Indian lyricists
Living people
Year of birth missing (living people)